Mark Bowes (born 17 February 1973) is a Scottish former professional footballer who played for Dunfermline Athletic and Forfar Athletic in the Scottish Football League.

References

External links

1973 births
Living people
Scottish footballers
Dunfermline Athletic F.C. players
Forfar Athletic F.C. players
Bathgate Thistle F.C. players
Scottish Football League players
Association football fullbacks
Scotland under-21 international footballers
Footballers from West Lothian